Walter G. Ehmer (born c. 1966) is an American businessman. He has served as the president and chief executive officer of Waffle House since 2012.

Early life
Ehmer was born circa 1966. He graduated from the Georgia Institute of Technology in 1989.

Career
Ehmer began his career at Allen-Bradley.

Ehmer joined Waffle House in 1992. He was appointed as vice president of finance in 1999, and chief financial officer in 2001. He has served as its president since 2006 and as its chief executive officer since 2012.

Ehmer serves on the board of directors of Aaron's, Inc.

In response to the COVID-19 pandemic in the United States, Ehmer announced in a letter to employees that, to allow the company more cash flow, he would voluntarily reduce his pay to half its normal rate while Joe Rogers Jr. would be forgoing any and all compensation for his work with the company.

References

Living people
Georgia Tech alumni
American chief executives
American corporate directors
1960s births
Waffle House people
Year of birth uncertain
20th-century American businesspeople
21st-century American businesspeople